Hirsutopalpis is a monotypic moth genus of the family Erebidae. Its only species, Hirsutopalpis fasciata, is found in New Guinea. Both the genus and the species were first described by George Thomas Bethune-Baker in 1904.

References

Calpinae
Monotypic moth genera